Gishiri may refer to:
 Gishiri cutting, a form of female genital mutilation practiced in Northern Nigeria and Southern Niger
 Gishiri Village, a village in the Maitama District of Abuja, Nigeria